Old Cut may refer to:

Old Cut water channel
Old Cut, Ontario, place